The Sisters, Servants of the Immaculate Heart of Mary (I.H.M.) is a Catholic religious institute of sisters, founded by Fr Louis Florent Gillet, CSsR, and a co-founder of the Oblate Sister of Providence, Mother Theresa Maxis Duchemin, in 1845.

Via their first Superior, Mother Duchemin, they were the first predominantly-White order founded by a Black Catholic (though the order hid this fact for 160 years).

Founded (and still headquartered) in Monroe, Michigan, the sisters originally began as teachers, but have since added ministries of: pastoral care in hospitals, long-term care facilities and other health care settings; parish ministry and outreach into poor communities and individuals in need; social services; working with those with AIDS; providing spiritual direction and retreats; advocacy efforts; programs and services for older adults in a variety of settings; and work to improve the environment.

The IHM is divided among three separate congregations, and the Motherhouse currently houses more than 200 sisters, more than 100 of whom require supportive care.

History
 
 
The beginnings of the institute came about in 1845 shortly after Father Louis Florent Gillet,  C.Ss.R., arrived in Monroe, Michigan, to become the pastor of St. Mary Parish. On November 10, Gillet and Theresa Maxis Duchemin, a biracial member of the Oblate Sisters of Providence in Baltimore, established the institute in Monroe.

Father Gillet found that Monroe had no school for the daughters of the descendants of French Canadians, most of whom were Catholic. He petitioned the local bishop, Peter Paul Lefevere, coadjutor bishop of Detroit, for a religious institute to assume teaching duties. The bishop declined, so Gillet invited three women to form a new religious congregation, which would become known as the Sisters, Servants of the Immaculate Heart of Mary.

The co-foundress and first religious superior of the Monroe community was Mother Theresa Maxis Duchemin, one of the first members of Oblate Sisters of Providence, the first religious congregation established in the country for women of African descent. On January 15, 1846, the first St. Mary Academy opened with 40 students.

In 1858, a mission was established to serve the German-speaking Catholic children of Pennsylvania at the request of the Bishop of Philadelphia, the now-sainted John Neumann. As a result of this mission, a dispute broke out between the bishops of Detroit and Philadelphia regarding their jurisdiction over the Sisters. Mother Theresa was faulted by Bishop Lefevre for this and was removed from her office of Superior General.  She was then sent to the mission in Pennsylvania. Shortly after this, in 1859, the Sisters in that state separated from the community in Michigan and were established as an independent congregation under the Bishop of Philadelphia.

This congregation later further split into two more, one based in Scranton, Pennsylvania (founded in 1871), and the other in Chester County, Pennsylvania.

In 1920, St. Mary Academy and College had outgrown its facilities and the institute made plans to construct a new college facility. The Sisters initially planned to build the new campus in Monroe, but Bishop Michael Gallagher invited them to build in nearby Detroit. In Detroit the college would have a larger field of influence and offer a Catholic higher education to thousands of young women who might otherwise not have such an opportunity. The Sisters built their new college in Detroit and named it Marygrove College.

On June 3, 1929, St. Mary Academy in Monroe was destroyed by fire. This caused extreme difficulties for the IHM institute, as they were burdened with heavy debts from the building of Marygrove College and the cost of rebuilding the motherhouse and academy in Monroe was prohibitive. Additionally, the Great Depression of 1929 began soon afterward, which only added to their financial woes. Nevertheless, the institute finished the reconstruction and moved into their new facilities in 1932. The congregation went on to establish Marian and Immaculata high schools in the Detroit area and Immaculate Heart of Mary High School in Westchester, Illinois.

In 1948, the Michigan congregation began its first missionary work outside the continental United States when the Sisters opened a mission in Cayey, Puerto Rico.

In 2008, the Sisters opened Detroit Cristo Rey High School and co-sponsor it with the Congregation of St. Basil.

In 2019, Marygrove College ceased operations.

Acknowledgement of foundress Duchemin 
Their co-founder, Mother Duchemin, was the first African-American to found a predominantly-White order, and one of the earliest Black Mother Superiors in the nation. She was also the first US-born Black Catholic to become a religious sister at all.

The IHM sisters, however, scrubbed their records of Duchemin for 160 years."[They] did not want to be associated with a black sister. It was "embarrassing" and "unpleasant," as sisters wrote in various letters. It would scare white people away from their ministries... before the 1980s, novices didn't even learn about Duchemin in formation... At one point, they even enlisted a cardinal to intervene in the publication of a book that might have outed them as having been co-founded by a black woman."In 1992, an IHM sister, Marger Gannon, published letters acknowledging Duchemin and her significance; this began a period of collaboration between the IHM and Oblate sisters (the latter of whom had always acknowledged Duchemin as their own co-founder), as well as a more general acknowledgement of Duchemin within the IHM community.

Educational institutions

Schools
Detroit Cristo Rey High School, Detroit, Michigan (co-sponsored)
Our Lady of Guadalupe Middle School, Detroit, Michigan (co-sponsored)
Our Lady of Lourdes Academy, Miami, Florida
Villa Maria Academy, Immaculata (Lower School) & Malvern (high school), Pennsylvania
Colegio Villa Maria Miraflores, Lima, Perú
Colegio Villa Maria La Planicie, Lima, Peru
Colegio Inmaculado Corazón, Lima, Peru
Villa Maria Academy (founded in 1940), Santiago de Chile, Chile
Marian High School, Bloomfield Hills, Michigan
Colegio San Antonio, Bellavista, Peru, (founded on 1928)
Epiphany Catholic School, Miami, FL
St. Francis de Sales Roman Catholic Church, West Philadelphia
Defunct
Girls Catholic Central High School, Detroit, Michigan
Hall of the Divine Child, Monroe, Michigan
Immaculata High School, Detroit, Michigan
Immaculate Heart of Mary High School, Westchester, Illinois (absorbed by St. Joseph High)
St. Mary's Academy, Monroe, Michigan (merged with Monroe Catholic Central High to form St. Mary Catholic Central High School)

Colleges and universities
Immaculata University, near Philadelphia, Pennsylvania
Marygrove College, Detroit, Michigan CLOSED
Marywood University, Scranton, Pennsylvania

In the arts
In 2012, the Monroe campus was used for filming numerous scenes of Arnaud Desplechin's movie Jimmy P: Psychotherapy of a Plains Indian (2013), which was entered in the 2013 Cannes Film Festival, depicting the now vanished Winter Veteran Hospital of Topeka, Kansas.

References

External links
The IHM Sisters in Monroe, Michigan

Catholic female orders and societies
Catholic educational institutions
Monroe, Michigan
Buildings and structures in Monroe County, Michigan
Religious organizations established in 1845
1845 establishments in Michigan
African-American Roman Catholicism